Lactofen is a complex ester of acifluorfen and is a nitrophenyl ether selective herbicide and fungicide. It is used in postemergence applications to certain crops which are resistant to its action. The name "Lactofen" is approved by the American National Standards Institute and the Weed Science Society of America, and is also approved in China (乳氟禾草灵).

Lactofen is applied as a foliar spray and is commonly used to control broadleaved weeds in soybean, cereals, potatoes and peanuts. It may be combined with oil or fertilizer adjuvants and surfactants. Some formulations include solvents such as xylenes and cumene. It is also used as a fungicide for Sclerotinia white molds on soybean.

Lactofen is available in solid form or as an emulsifiable concentrate under the trade name COBRA.

Toxicology
Lactofen is slightly to non-toxic to humans when ingested or inhaled. It can cause skin irritation including reddening, swelling and possibly corrosive burns. It is a severe eye irritant and can cause permanent damage to eyes when there is sufficient exposure.

It was found to be practically non-toxic to the species of bird that were studied. Toxicity to fish and other aquatic organisms varied and it was eliminated in fish within fourteen days. It is of low toxicity to bees.

Lactofen has a very low solubility in water and is not expected to contaminate surface waters. It binds tightly to soil and is then broken down in between one and seven days.

References

External links
 

Herbicides
Chloroarenes
Trifluoromethyl compounds
Carboxylate esters
Ethyl esters
Fungicides